Hamidreza Taherkhani is an Iranian footballer who plays as a forward for Segunda División RFEF club Juventud de Torremolinos CF.

Club career

Early years
Taherkhani started his career with Arad Takestan from youth levels. In 2014, he joined to Persepolis Academy and played for U16 side. He finished 2014–15 season in 2nd place of top scores of Tehran U16 Asia Vision Premier League. He also chosen as the best U16 player of Persepolis Academy in this season.

Rah Ahan
Taherkhani joined Rah Ahan in summer 2015 with a contract until 2018. He made his professional debut for Rah Ahan on December 13, 2015 in 0-0 draw against Sepahan as a substitute for Mehrdad Mohammadi.

Honours
Persepolis
Persian Gulf Pro League (2): 2016–17, 2017–18
Iranian Super Cup (3): 2017, 2018, 2019
AFC Champions League runner-up: 2018

References

External links

 Hamidreza Taherkhani at IranLeague.ir

1999 births
Living people
Iranian footballers
People from Takestan
Rah Ahan players
Persepolis F.C. players
Association football forwards
Sepidrood Rasht players